Aliabad (also Romanized as ‘Alīābād; also known as ‘Alīābād-e Khenāmān) is a village in Khenaman Rural District, in the Central District of Rafsanjan County, Kerman Province, Iran. At the 2006 census, its population was 31, in 13 families.

References 

Populated places in Rafsanjan County